The Medal "For Life Saving" is a state decoration of the Russian Federation.

History 
The Medal "For Life Saving" was established on March 2, 1994 by Presidential Decree № 442.  Its statute was amended three times, first on January 6, 1999 by presidential decree № 19, again on June 1, 1995 by presidential decree № 554 and lastly by the all encompassing presidential decree № 1099  of September 7, 2010 which amended the entire Russian awards system away from the distinctions of the Soviet Era.

Award Statute 
The Medal "For Life Saving" is awarded to citizens for rescuing people during natural disasters, on water, under ground, in fire-fighting and other circumstances involving a risk to life.  The medal may be awarded posthumously.

The order of precedence of the Russian Federation states that the Medal "For Life Saving" is to be worn on the left breast with other medals and placed immediately after the Medal "For Distinction in Protection of the State Borders".

Award Description 
The Medal "For Life Saving" is a circular 32mm diameter silver medal with raised rims on both the obverse and reverse.  The obverse bears the relief image of the Order of Courage.  On the reverse lower center and left half, intertwined branches of palm, laurel and oak.  In the right half of the reverse, the relief inscription "FOR LIFE SAVING".  In the lower portion of the reverse, below the branches just above the lower rim of the medal, a relief letter "N" with a line reserved for the award serial number.

The medal is suspended to a standard Russian pentagonal mount with a ring through the medal's suspension loop.  The mount is covered by an overlapping 24mm wide white silk moiré ribbon with 2mm red edge stripes.

Numbers Awarded 
 Medals awarded to date:

See also 
Awards and decorations of the Russian Federation

References

External links 
The Commission on State Awards to the President of the Russian Federation

Orders, decorations, and medals of Russia
Civil awards and decorations of Russia
Russian awards
Courage awards
Awards established in 1994
1994 establishments in Russia